Sailing was contested at the 2011 Summer Universiade at the Seven Star Bay Marina and the Shenzhen Maritime Sports Base & Sailing School in Shenzhen, China. Fleet sailing and team sailing events were held.

Medal summary

Medal table

Fleet events

Men

Women

Team events

References

Universiade
2011 Summer Universiade events
Sailing at the Summer Universiade
Sailing competitions in China